KDJJ (94.1 FM) is a radio station licensed to serve the community of Fernley, Nevada. The station is owned by Northway Broadcasting, LLC, and airs a talk radio format.

The station was assigned the KDJJ call letters by the Federal Communications Commission on September 9, 2016.

References

External links
 Official Website
 FCC Public Inspection File for KDJJ
 

DJJ
Radio stations established in 2016
2016 establishments in Nevada
Talk radio stations in the United States
Lyon County, Nevada